Akifumi Miura (三浦アキフミ, or 三浦哲郁; born 16 November 1981) is a Japanese actor. He made his debut in the popular 2001 film Waterboys.

Selected filmography
2005 Germanium no yoru
2005 Tomie: Beginning
2004 Tsuki to Cherry
2004 Kurimu remon
2002 Jam Films ('Justice' segment)
2001 Waterboys

External links

1981 births
Living people
Japanese male actors